Caryedon serratus, known generally as the groundnut bruchid or groundnut borer, is a species of leaf beetle in the family Chrysomelidae. It is found in Africa, the Caribbean, Europe and Northern Asia (excluding China), Central America, North America, Oceania, and South America.

References

Further reading

 
 

There was a publication L38, in 1973 by the National Resources Institute, "A Preliminary Investigation of Field and Secco Infestation of Gambian Groundnuts by Caryedon serratus (01). It made very interesting reading, and proved the infestations were most manifest at the transit  crossings near the Gambia River. They used Lindane as a pesticide, then Malathion, then finally a gas under plastic sheeting, but may have another method by now. The beetles become immune to the pesticide after about 10 years.

Bruchinae
Articles created by Qbugbot
Beetles described in 1790